The Dubai Development Authority (DDA) (Arabic: سلطة دبي للتطوير), formally known as the Dubai Creative Clusters Authority and Dubai Technology and Media Free Zone Authority, is a Dubai Government authority that oversees the development, control,  municipal, economic and immigration functions across select free zones clusters and other communities by various master developers throughout Dubai.

The Authority was launched in 2000 to establish Dubai as a worldwide hub for knowledge-based industries.

The Authority is the main regulatory and administrative body for a number of free zone parks in Dubai. In addition to managing the application procedures and issuing licenses for all new businesses, it also enforces and passes laws within its jurisdiction. Sheikh Maktoum Bin Mohammed Bin Rashid Al Maktoum, Deputy Ruler of Dubai was appointed as Chairman of Dubai Creative Clusters Authority, and Ahmad Bin Byat as its Director General. The Authority is mandated to drive the growth of Dubai's creative industries by developing policies and programmes to attract, retain and grow creative businesses in Dubai.

The Authority has partnered with Dubai SME to support entrepreneurs and enhance the capabilities of the vital SME sector in the emirate.

In June 2015, DCCA launched its first report, entitled, "Celebrating 15 years of success and a new mandate." The report provides details of the Authority's new mandate and the ways in which it will support and enhance Dubai's creative industries. It will be used as a benchmark to measure DCCA's delivery against its mandate and is a stepping stone towards fulfilling the Authority's role in providing research, intelligence and advocacy.

The DDA issues licences for the Dubai Internet City, Dubai Media City, Dubai Knowledge Park, Dubai International Academic City, Dubai Production City, Dubai Outsource City, Dubai Studio City, Dubai Science Park and Dubai Design District.

The Authority has established industry councils and committees to champion key creative industries, investing AED 40 million annually towards the Dubai International Film Festival, Dubai Film and TV Commission, and Dubai Design and Fashion Council.

References

2014 establishments in the United Arab Emirates
Organizations established in 2014
Government agencies of Dubai
Economy of Dubai
Culture in Dubai